Foreign affairs, or foreign policy, consists of strategies chosen by a state to safeguard its national interests and to achieve goals in international relations.

Foreign Affairs is an American journal of international relations.

Foreign affairs and similar terms may also refer to:

International relations 
 Ministry of foreign affairs, a governmental cabinet department; includes a list of Foreign Ministries
 Diplomacy, the art and practice of conducting negotiations between states
 International relations, an academic field of study
 Civil affairs, a term used by the United Nations and military organizations to cover methods of dealing with civilian population

Film and television 
 Foreign Affaires, a 1935 British comedy film
 A Foreign Affair, a 1948 American romantic comedy film by Billy Wilder
 Foreign Affairs (1964 TV series), a 1964 ITV British sitcom and spin-off of Bootsie and Snudge
 Foreign Affairs (1966 TV series), a 1966 BBC British sitcom starring Leslie Phillips
 "Foreign Affairs" (Family Guy), episode 17 of season 9 (2011)

Music

Albums
Foreign Affair (Frankie Laine album), 1958
 Foreign Affair,  Tina Turner album, 1989
 Foreign Affairs (Tom Waits album), 1977, including song "Foreign Affair"
 Foreign Affairs (Sharon O'Neill album), 1983
 A Foreign Affair (Gasolin' album), 1997
 A Foreign Affair II, double compilation album released by Gasolin' in 2002
A Foreign Affair (Spyro Gyra album), 2011

Songs
 "Foreign Affair" (Tina Turner song), the title song
 "Foreign Affair" (Mike Oldfield song), 1983
 A Foreign Affair (song), a Client Liaison song, featuring Tina Arena, 2017

Tours 

 Foreign Affair: The Farewell Tour, a 1990 concert tour by Turner

Other uses
 A Foreign Affair (company), an international dating and marriage agency
 Foreign Affairs (novel), a 1984 novel by Alison Lurie